Nicolas Lasorsa (born 17 February 1954) is a French weightlifter. He competed in the men's lightweight event at the 1980 Summer Olympics.

References

1954 births
Living people
French male weightlifters
Olympic weightlifters of France
Weightlifters at the 1980 Summer Olympics
Place of birth missing (living people)